Truro Rural District was a local government division of Cornwall in England, UK, between 1894 and 1974. Established under the Local Government Act 1894 in 1934, the rural district was enlarged by the abolition of East Kerrier Rural District, Redruth Rural District and St Columb Major Rural District, but was reduced to enlarge Truro Municipal Borough.

In 1974, the district was abolished under the Local Government Act 1972, forming part of the new Carrick district.

Civil parishes
The civil parishes within the district were:

 Chacewater
 Cubert
 Cuby
 Feock
 Gerrans
 Gwennap
 Kea
 Kenwyn
 Ladock
 Mylor
 Perranarworthal
 Perranzabuloe
 Philleigh
 Probus
 Ruanlanihorne
 St Agnes
 St Allen
 St Clement
 St Erme
 St Just in Roseland
 St Michael Penkevil
 St Newlyn East
 Tregoney
 Veryan

References

Districts of England created by the Local Government Act 1894
Districts of England abolished by the Local Government Act 1972
Rural districts of England
Local government in Cornwall
History of Cornwall